This is the list of the leaders of Georgia since 1918, during the periods of the short-lived Democratic Republic of Georgia (1918–1921), Soviet Georgia (1921–1991), and current Georgia. For the head of government, see Prime Minister of Georgia.

List (1918–present)

Transcaucasian Democratic Federative Republic (1918)

Democratic Republic of Georgia (1918–1921)

Transcaucasian Socialist Federative Soviet Republic (1922–1936) and Georgian Soviet Socialist Republic (1936–1990)

Georgia (since 1991)
President of Georgia

Notes

See also
President of Georgia

Government of Georgia (country)
Modern history of Georgia (country)
Politics of Georgia (country)
Leaders